The NABI LFW was a line of low-floor transit buses available in 30' rigid, 35' rigid, 40' rigid, and 60' articulated lengths manufactured by North American Bus Industries (NABI) between 1997 and 2015. In addition to the different available lengths, the buses were sold with a variety of powertrains, including conventional diesel, LNG, and CNG combustion engines along with a diesel-electric hybrid system

The NABI LFW was sold alongside the older NABI SFW (NABI 416 and 436) high-floor buses and the both models featured similar styling, with the LFW having comparatively taller side windows in the low-floor portion of the bus.

In 1998, NABI announced development of the composite-bodied low-floor CompoBus, which initially had identical styling to the LFW line; the first CompoBus orders were taken in 1999. In addition, NABI introduced the streamlined low-floor BRT line, marketed for bus rapid transit services in 2004. The NABI LFW was restyled in 2008 and again in 2011, with cosmetic changes to the front of the bus to more closely resemble the NABI BRT styling. 

After New Flyer acquired NABI in 2013, all NABI product lines were discontinued in 2015, once existing orders for NABI buses had been fulfilled.

Design
The NABI LFW line uses a model number designating the nominal length along with the LFW family designator. For example, a NABI 40-LFW is a 40' (nominal) rigid low floor transit bus. At launch, 35-foot and 40-foot nominal lengths were announced, with the 40-LFW more popular with fixed-route transit agencies. A 60-foot articulated variant (60-LFW) was ordered in 2001. The 31-foot NABI 31-LFW was introduced with the first 'Gen II' restyle in 2008. On the stamped vehicle identification plate, the vehicle type is identified as 0xx.nn, where 0xx is the nominal length (in feet) and nn is the order number.

Despite its superficial resemblance to the preceding NABI 416 high-floor transit bus, which had been designed by Ikarus in Hungary, the NABI LFW line was designed in America. Body shells were assembled in Hungary and shipped to Alabama for finishing. In 1998, NABI announced the LFW would be available with a stainless steel frame as an option. Body production was shifted from Hungary to Anniston gradually starting in 2011; in late 2012, the transition was complete.

The 2008 'Gen II' restyle, which added small quarter windows at the front between the windshield and the driver's side window or door, was designed to echo the styling of the NABI BRT, introduced in 2004. However, the small quarter windows could not be cleared during inclement weather and were removed in the subsequent 2011 'Gen III' restyle.

Hybrid
The 2008 restyle also brought a hybrid bus variant, with Citizens Area Transit (serving Las Vegas, Nevada) as the lead customer.

Deployment
The first NABI LFW buses (40-LFW) were ordered in 1997 by Valley Metro, the transit agency serving Phoenix and Tempe, Arizona. NABI was acquired by New Flyer in 2013 and production of NABI-designed buses continued through 2015 to fill the existing backlog. The final NABI buses to be built were the 40-LFW completed in 2015 for DART, serving Dallas, Texas. After the backlog was filled, the NABI factory in Anniston, Alabama was retooled to produce New Flyer Xcelsior low-floor buses for the United States transit market.

The first (and only) order for articulated LFW buses (60-LFW) was placed by the Chicago Transit Authority (CTA) in 2001 to replace its ageing fleet of MAN SG 220 and SG 310 articulated buses. Eventually, CTA acquired 226 60-LFW buses, with deliveries starting in 2003. The NABI 60-LFW fleet proved to be problematic in service, and were pulled from service in 2009 due to cracks in the articulation joint and axles. CTA stopped payment on the contract and was sued by NABI in 2008; after filing a countersuit, CTA began scrapping the buses in 2012. The suits were eventually settled in Chicago's favor for $36.25 million.

Approximately 4,500 LFW buses were produced from 1998 through 2013. Most of the LFW production was for the 40-LFW model, with more than fifty orders; there were six orders for 31-LFW, eighteen orders for the 35-LFW, and two orders for the 60-LFW (including one order for the bus tested at Altoona, which was later sold as part of the CTA order).

See also
 Gillig Low Floor
 Neoplan AN440L
 New Flyer Low Floor
 Nova Bus LF Series
 Orion VI

References

External links

 
 
 
 

Buses of the United States
Vehicles introduced in 1997
Articulated buses